Brooke Mackenzie Henderson (born 10 September 1997) is a Canadian professional golfer on the LPGA Tour.

Henderson was named the Canadian Press female athlete of the year for 2015, 2017 and 2018. She won her first major at age 18 in 2016 at the KPMG Women's PGA Championship, becoming the event's youngest winner. With 13 LPGA wins as of January 2023, Henderson has the most victories of any Canadian golfer on major professional tours. She won her second career major title at the 2022 Evian Championship.

In November 2019, she was named the winner of the 2019 Founders Award by a vote of fellow golfers on the LPGA Tour as someone "whose behaviour and deeds best exemplify the spirit, ideals, and values of the LPGA."

Early years, family and education
Henderson was born on born 10 September 1997 and raised in Smiths Falls, Ontario, she learned golf from an early age at the Smiths Falls Golf and Country Club. Her parents are both experienced players, while her uncle Tom Henderson competed frequently for many years at the top amateur level in the Ottawa area. Henderson's sister Brittany Henderson, older by seven years, was also a top junior and college golfer. She graduated from Smiths Falls District Collegiate Institute in June 2014.

Henderson won the Canadian Women's Amateur in 2013, and finished runner-up at the 2014 U.S. Women's Amateur. While still an amateur, she won three events on the CN Canadian Women's Tour and finished tied for 10th place in the U.S. Women's Open at age 16. She won numerous amateur tournaments and was the top-ranked female amateur golfer in the world before turning professional in December 2014, passing up the chance to play college scholarship golf.

Development and sponsorships
Since 2012, Henderson has been in training with Golf Canada's amateur and young professional development programs called "Team Canada".

Henderson has signed several corporate sponsorships:
 IMG to manage her professional affairs
 Royal Bank of Canada for banking and financial services
 Sunice Golf for golf apparel and outerwear
 To begin the 2023 season, Henderson signed a multiyear sponsorship with TaylorMade
 Skechers Performance for Go Golf footwear

Henderson has signed other sponsorship deals with Canadian Pacific, MasterCard, Rolex, BMW, BioSteel, and Golf Town. As of 2017, Henderson became a resident touring professional at Miromar Lakes Beach and Golf Club, Miromar Lakes, Florida.

Professional career

2015
Henderson set a tournament record with her 36-hole score at the LPGA Tour's Swinging Skirts LPGA Classic in April 2015, at the Lake Merced Golf Club, just south of San Francisco. Her second round 65 (−7) gave her 135 (−9), breaking the record set by Stacy Lewis in 2014 by three shots. She finished third, one stroke behind Lydia Ko, the playoff winner, and runner-up Morgan Pressel.

At age 17, Henderson had to play her way into LPGA Tour events through Monday qualifiers, and to rely on sponsor exemptions, after her request for an age waiver to compete at the LPGA Tour Q School in late 2014 was denied. She earned a Symetra Tour card after winning her first event as a professional, the Four Winds Invitational in Indiana in June 2015. With a final round 66 (−4), Henderson tied for fifth at the U.S. Women's Open in July.

After Monday-qualifying for the Cambia Portland Classic in Oregon in August, Henderson won the event by eight shots, the largest victory margin on tour since 2012, and became the tour's third-youngest winner. She was only the second Monday qualifier to win on tour, and the first since Laurel Kean in 2000. Henderson was also the first Canadian to win on the LPGA Tour since Lorie Kane in 2001, and was granted immediate LPGA Tour membership.

2016
In June 2016, Henderson won her first major championship, at the KPMG Women's PGA Championship at Sahalee Country Club near Seattle. Her final round 65 (−6) propelled her into a tie with top-ranked Lydia Ko, followed by a playoff which Henderson won with a birdie on the first hole. At age 18, she became the youngest to win that major, the second-youngest in any women's major, and the first Canadian woman to win a major in 48 years. It was Henderson's second tour win, both in the Pacific Northwest, and her first as a tour member; it moved her from fourth to second in the world rankings.

With her win as defending champion at the Cambia Portland Classic in June 2016, Henderson joined Sandra Post and Lorie Kane as the only Canadians to win multiple LPGA events in the same season.

Henderson was a member of the Canadian Olympic Team for the 2016 Summer Olympics in Rio de Janeiro in the women's Olympic golf tournament, placing seventh.

2017
In June 2017, Henderson won the Meijer LPGA Classic. Her win on 2 October 2017 at the McKayson New Zealand Women's Open was her first LPGA championship outside North America.

2018
On 14 April, Henderson won the Lotte Championship, her sixth victory on the LPGA Tour finishing at −12 to win by four strokes over Azahara Muñoz.

On 26 August, Henderson became the first Canadian in 45 years – after Jocelyne Bourassa in 1973 – to win the Canadian Women's Open at the Wascana Country Club in Regina, Saskatchewan.

By finishing second (to Ariya Jutanugarn) in the 2018 season-ending Race to the CME Globe, Henderson was awarded $150,000 from the bonus pool purse. She was awarded the Bobbie Rosenfeld Award in December 2018 as The Canadian Press Female Athlete of the Year for the third time.

2019
On 20 April 2019, Henderson defended her title at the Lotte Championship in Hawaii. This marked her eighth victory on the LPGA Tour, tying Sandra Post, Mike Weir and George Knudson for the most victories by a Canadian golfer on the LPGA or PGA Tours.

On 16 June 2019, Henderson won the Meijer LPGA Classic in Michigan for the second time – the third LPGA event where she has multiple victories. This was her ninth victory on the LPGA, giving her the most victories on major tours of any professional golfer in Canadian history.

2021
Henderson won the Hugel-Air Premia LA Open on 24 April 2021 for her tenth LPGA Tour victory.

2022
Henderson increased her LPGA victory total to 11 with her win at the ShopRite LPGA Classic in a playoff over Lindsey Weaver-Wright on 12 June 2022.

Henderson won her second career major at the 2022 Evian Championship, in which she was the first player in LPGA history to begin a major with two rounds of 64 or lower.

On 12 November, the day after shooting a first round, one-over-par 71 at the Pelican Women's Championship, she  wrote in a statement that she had to withdraw, "due to an injury in my upper back, it was recommended that I rest as much as possible coming into the week. While I plan to address any medical concerns and recover fully in the off season, I am trying to do everything I can to compete this week. I appreciate all of the support."

2023
On 22 January, Henderson won the 2023 Hilton Grand Vacations Tournament of Champions at Lake Nona Golf & Country Club in Orlando, completing all four rounds in the lead, and achieving her 13th victory on the LPGA Tour.

Amateur wins
 2010 CN du Quebec
 2011 CN Future Links Ontario, Ontario Junior Girls Championship, Optimist Junior 13-14, Genesis Junior
 2012 Ravenwood Junior Girls Championship, Ontario Junior Girls Championship, Canadian Junior Girls Championship
 2013 South American Amateur, CN Future Links Pacific Championship, Canadian Women's Amateur
 2014 Junior Orange Bowl International, South Atlantic Ladies' Amateur Championship (SALLY Tournament), Scott Robertson Memorial, Porter Cup, Ontario Women's Amateur, Espirito Santo Trophy (individual winner)

Source:

Professional wins (20)

LPGA Tour wins (13)

LPGA Tour playoff record (2–1)

Symetra Tour wins (1)

CN Canadian Women's Tour (4)
 2012 Beloeil Golf Club event (as an amateur)
 2014 Legends of Niagara event, PGA Women's Championship of Canada (both as an amateur)
 2015 PGA Women's Championship of Canada

Other wins (2)
 2015 SunCoast Series at Winter Garden, SunCoast Series Winter Championship

Major championships

Wins (2)

1 Defeated Ko in a sudden-death playoff: Henderson (3) and Ko (4).

Results timeline
Results not in chronological order before 2019 or in 2020.

LA = Low amateur
CUT = missed the half-way cut
WD = withdrew
NT = No tournament
T = tied

Summary

 Most consecutive cuts made – 18 (2013 U.S. Open – 2018 ANA)
 Longest streak of top-10s – 2 (four times, current)

LPGA Tour career summary

^ Official as of 5 March 2023
*Includes matchplay and other tournaments without a cut.

World ranking
Position in Women's World Golf Rankings at the end of each calendar year.

^ as of 6 March 2023

Team appearances
Amateur
 Espirito Santo Trophy (representing Canada): 2012, 2014

Awards
 2015 Ontario Athlete of the Year (Syl Apps Athlete of the Year Award)
 2015 Canadian Press Female Athlete of the Year (Bobbie Rosenfeld Award)
 2017 Ottawa Person of the Year by The Athletic
 2017 Canadian Press Female Athlete of the Year (Bobbie Rosenfeld Award)
 2018 Canadian Press Female Athlete of the Year (Bobbie Rosenfeld Award)
 2019 ESPY Award, Best Female Golfer
 2019 LPGA Founders Award
 2019 Canada's Sports Hall of Fame People's Choice Award

See also
List of golfers with most LPGA Tour wins

References

External links

Canadian female golfers
LPGA Tour golfers
Winners of LPGA major golf championships
Olympic golfers of Canada
Golfers at the 2016 Summer Olympics
Golfers at the 2020 Summer Olympics
Golfing people from Ontario
People from Smiths Falls
1997 births
Living people